The Annapurna Circuit  is a trek within the mountain ranges of central Nepal. The total length of the route varies between 160–230 km (100-145 mi), depending on where motor transportation is used and where the trek is ended. This trek crosses two different river valleys and encircles the Annapurna Massif. The path reaches its highest point at Thorung La pass (5416m/17769 ft), reaching the edge of the Tibetan plateau. Most trekkers hike the route anticlockwise, as this way the daily altitude gain is slower, and crossing the high Thorong La pass is easier and safer.  

The mountain scenery, seen at close quarters includes the Annapurna Massif (Annapurna I-IV), Dhaulagiri, Machhapuchhre, Manaslu, Gangapurna, Tilicho Peak, Pisang Peak, and Paungda Danda. Numerous other peaks of 6000-8000m in elevation rise from the Annapurna range.

The trek begins at Besisahar or Bhulbhule in the Marshyangdi river valley and concludes in the Kali Gandaki Gorge. Besisahar can be reached after a seven-hour drive from Kathmandu.  The trail passes along paddy fields and into subtropical forests, several waterfalls and gigantic cliffs, and various villages. 

Annapurna Circuit has been voted as the best long-distance trek in the world, as it combined, in its old full form, a wide variety of climate zones from tropics at 600 m asl to the arctic at 5416 m asl at the Thorong La pass and cultural variety from Hindu villages at the low foothills to the Tibetan culture of Manang Valley and lower Mustang. Continuing construction of a road has shortened the trail and changed the villages. The Beisahar-Manag road has been built which passes through the trekking trail much of the time.  With the construction of roads, mountain biking is becoming popular, with Mustang, in particular.

Standard trek 

The trek usually takes about 15–20 days, leaving from Kathmandu with a stopover in Pokhara before returning to the capital. The trail is moderate to fairly challenging and makes numerous river crossings over steel and wooden suspension bridges. Tea houses and lodges along the circuit are available for meals and accommodations. Some groups may opt for tents but these are typically only used for side trips away from lodges such as climbing a peak.

It is also possible to continue from Ghorepani to Tadapani, Ghandruk, Landruk, and then to Phedi, which follows the old Annapurna Circuit from the time when the road was not yet extended to Beni. The circuit can also be extended to visit Annapurna Base Camp (also called Annapurna Sanctuary). This trail turns to the north from Tadapani and rejoins the old circuit at either Ghandruk or Landruk.

Weather 
While trekking in the Himalayas in the wet season is generally not possible, much of the Annapurna circuit sits within a rain shadow, so that it is possible to trek most parts of the circuit year-round, including the monsoon period. Trekking in the wet season is often encouraged as hikers avoid the crowds that plague the summer months. However, the days are often damp and many of the views are obscured by clouds.

October – November 
This is the most popular hiking season in Nepal. Though the weather is generally warm, nighttime temperatures drop below freezing. This is the busiest period on the circuit and tea houses book up very quickly.

December – March 
This is the coldest period on the circuit. Depending on the altitude, daytime temperatures will be cold and nighttime temperatures drop well below freezing. The trade-off is that the trails are much less busy. Thorung La Pass, which stands at over 5,400 meters, is often blocked with snow and may be closed for days on end. Unless the snow blocks most trails, tea houses still remain open during this period. Clouds prevail more frequently, but clear days are still common. Towards March the rhododendrons start flowering. This period is also when avalanches are most common.

April – May 
Because of the warming weather, April to May is the second most popular trekking season on the circuit. Most of the snow has melted. As the monsoon period builds towards the end of May, the days become hotter and more humid.

June – September 
This is the monsoon period. Whilst the south section of the Annapurna Circuit near Pokhara gets a lot of rain, the northern parts often receive less than 10% of the precipitation due to their location within a rain shadow.

History 
The Annapurna area was opened to foreign trekkers in 1977 after the disputes between CIA-backed Khampa guerrillas operating from the area into Tibet, and the local populace and Nepal army were settled. The original trek started from the market town of Dhumre situated at the Kathmandu - Pokhara highway and ended in Pokhara, and took about 23 days to complete. Road construction started in the early 1980s both from Dhumre to the north and from Pokhara to the west and then up the Kali Gandaki valley. The road has now reached past Manang on the Marsyangdi river valley and Muktinath on the Kali Gandaki side. Of the trek's original 23 days, only 2 sections of 2-3 walking days in the length of the trek are now without a motor road, namely Thorong La pass and the section over Ghorepani/Poon Hill. In places, new trails and routes have been marked so that the road can be partly avoided. The existence of the road has nevertheless changed the area, appearance, and atmosphere of the villages. The road facilitates transport, increasing the popularity of mountain biking in the area. Since 2011, companies in Muktinath and Jomsom rent out mountain bikes to tourists. As the road sees very little traffic, and one can ride downhill (dirt road and/or single track) from Muktinath to Tatopani and descend almost 3000 meters in 2–3 days.

New areas near Annapurna have been opened for trekkers in the past years, such as Upper Mustang, Nar-Pho Valley, Manaslu and Tsum Valley. Currently, trekking these areas is restricted and subject to extra permits, costs, and other limitations.

In October 2014, Seth Wolpin achieved the fastest known time in 72 hours and 4 minutes. He started in Besisahar and finished in Nayapull, following all New Annapurna Trekking Trails.

It is reported that time has been recently surpassed by Greek athlete and philanthropist Lefteris Paraskevas, who, in May 2017 completed the classic route of the Circuit, from Besisahar to Nayapul, in 68 hours and 22 minutes.

2014 blizzard

In October 2014, a sudden blizzard killed over 43 people, half of whom were Nepalese.  It was caused by the tail end of a dying cyclone which had ravaged the eastern coast of India; there were about 350 hikers caught in the blizzard.

Communications 
Multiple locations of the trek circuit now have an Internet connection. This multi-district circuit's trekkers can use wireless internet across different districts like in Kaski, Myagdi, Lamjung and Mustang. Cellular 3G is also available at some locations.

See also
{Everest Base Camp Trek}Everest Base Camp Trek

References

External links

 

Hiking trails in Nepal
Tourist attractions in Nepal
Geography of Pokhara